The Genesee Valley Conservancy (GVC) is a non-profit land trust based in Geneseo, New York, United States, that exists to protect land in the Genesee River watershed. Founded in 1990, GVC works "to protect the habitat, open space, and farmland of the Genesee Valley region." GVC has completed projects in Livingston, Erie, Monroe, Ontario, Wyoming. and Allegany counties. A full-time staff completes the daily operations of GVC, with assistance from part-time staff, interns, and volunteers. GVC is governed by a Board of Directors, and supported by members.

External links 
 
 Google Map of GVC projects - an interactive Google map with photos of each GVC project and links to GVC's public access nature preserves
 The Land Trust Alliance - A national organization assisting land trusts in their conservation efforts

Land trusts in New York (state)
Farms in New York (state)
Environmental organizations established in 1990
1990 establishments in New York (state)